Choti Padoli railway station (station code: CPW) is a railway station on New Delhi–Chennai main line in Nagpur CR railway division of Central Railway Zone of Indian Railways. It serves Padoli, a suburb of Chandrapur, in Chandrapur district in Maharashtra State in India. It is located at 188 m above sea level and has a single platform. Only passenger trains stop at this station.

References

Nagpur CR railway division
Railway stations in Chandrapur district